John Yarde-Buller may refer to:
 John Yarde-Buller, 1st Baron Churston, British politician
 John Yarde-Buller, 2nd Baron Churston, British peer and soldier
 John Yarde-Buller, 3rd Baron Churston, British peer and soldier
 John Buller (cricketer), English cricketer and British Army officer

See also
 Joan Yarde-Buller, English socialite
 John Buller (disambiguation)